Nogometno društvo Slovan or simply ND Slovan is a Slovenian football club based in Ljubljana that competes in the Slovenian Third League, the third tier of Slovenian football. The team play their home matches at the Kodeljevo Sports Park. The traditional colours of the club are red and white.

History
The club was founded in 1913 and has held its original name since then. They have won the Slovenian Republic League twice, in 1965 and 1983, and participated in the Yugoslav Second League in 1965–66 and 1983–84. Slovan also won the Slovenian Republic Cup in 1982. After 1991, Slovan played in the Slovenian PrvaLiga for three seasons, scoring 10th, 11th and 15th place. In 1996 they merged with Slavija Vevče and formed ND Slovan-Slavija, which played in top flight under the sponsorship name Set Vevče in 1997–98, but was relegated at the end of the season. After another relegation and sponsor withdrawal, Slovan started on their own in the Slovenian Third League in 1999.

Honours
Slovenian Republic League
 Winners: 1964–65, 1982–83

Slovenian Republic Cup
 Winners: 1981–82

Slovenian Fourth Division
 Winners: 2001–02

References

External links
Official website 

Association football clubs established in 1913
Football clubs in Slovenia
Football clubs in Ljubljana
1913 establishments in Austria-Hungary